Starship Troopers 3: Marauder is a 2008 American military science fiction horror film written and directed by Edward Neumeier and starring Casper Van Dien, who returned as Johnny Rico from the original film, along with Jolene Blalock and Boris Kodjoe. It is a sequel to Starship Troopers (1997) and Starship Troopers 2: Hero of the Federation (2004) (which were both written by Neumeier) and the third installment of the Starship Troopers film series. The film was released directly to video in the U.S. on August 5, 2008.
The film received mixed reviews from critics, who praised the return to the first film's roots as well as Van Dien's performance but criticized for its special effects.

Plot
In the eleven years of "The Second Bug War", the Mobile Infantry has improved their weapons and tactics, while the Bugs have countered by developing many new Arachnid variants. The United Citizen Federation now finds itself engaged in prolonged trench warfare. The Federation puts out a positive spin through the media, while using its judicial and military authority to suppress peace protesters and religious fanatics as seditionists.

Colonel Johnny Rico is stationed on the agricultural planet Roku San, where the popular Sky Marshal Omar Anoke pays a visit. Rico's old friend, General Dix Hauser, gets into a bar fight with a group of anti-war farmers. When Rico stops Dix from shooting a farmer, Dix orders his arrest, but the base defenses suddenly fail due to a Bug attack. Rico knocks down Dix and leaves to help fight the Arachnids. When Roku San falls, the Federal Media blames Rico, who is condemned to execution for insubordination.

Captain Lola Beck is piloting Anoke to Sanctuary, the Fleet's secret HQ, when they are marooned on the classified planet OM-1. Admiral Enolo Phid suppresses this information so as not to lower public morale and support for the war effort, but Dix learns of the situation and has Rico's execution faked, wanting him to rescue Anoke and Beck, the latter being one of the few Federation pilots who knows the location of Sanctuary, which would cripple the military if the Arachnids discovered it. On OM-1, an apparent earthquake causes Dr. Wiggs to fall into a crevasse, where Anoke sees a giant eye staring at him from below. Cynical cook Jingo Ryan perishes next after he takes shelter within a cluster of rock outcroppings, which are actually Arachnid limbs which pull him below. Engineer Bull Brittles asks the deeply religious Holly Little to marry him, but dies shortly after.

On Earth, Hauser confronts Phid about why she is abandoning the Sky Marshal, only to be arrested. Phid reveals that Anoke is responsible for the downfall of Roku San, having telepathically communicated with the "Brain of Brains", also known as "Behemecoatyl", through a previously captured Brain Bug. Delusionally thinking that he could save humanity if he could make peace with them, Anoke adopted the Bugs’ religion and turned off the electric barrier surrounding the base on Roku San to demonstrate his willingness for peace between the two species. The Federation now believes the original Brain Bug allowed itself to be captured in order to pass on intelligence from inside the Federation. When the Federation decides to kill and dissect their Brain Bug, it somehow discerns their plot and unleashes a telepathic scream, slaughtering a few soldiers before Hauser kills it. It is revealed that Phid ignored the distress calls from OM-1 so she could become the new Sky Marshal; however, she failed to consider that the highly skilled Beck would be with Anoke.

On OM-1, the stranded make contact with Behemecoatyl, who communicates with them through the corpses of their fallen comrades and soon kills Anoke to absorb his knowledge; Beck and Holly, the last survivors, begin praying for salvation. Rico leads the Marauders, an elite team of troopers composed of his command staff from Roku San, on a rescue mission, using the Federation's new battle-suits. They defeat the Arachnid warriors on OM-1, suffer no casualties, and rescue Beck and Holly. OM-1 is revealed to be the home of the Bug Hive, the Arachnids' ruling body, and Fleet destroys it from orbit with a "Q Bomb".

Rico is subsequently cleared of all pending charges, promoted to the rank of General and given command of the Marauder program. Anoke is reported to have died in a terrorist attack, staged by the government to explain his disappearance, and given a hero's funeral. Dix and Beck are married, Phid is appointed the new Sky Marshal with Dix as her second-in command, and Holly becomes the first Federal chaplain. Dozens of peace protesters are hanged in connection to the purported terrorist attack.  Phid, impressed by how Sky Marshal Anoke was rendered servile by the Arachnids' religion, decides the Federation should adopt a religion, and Christianity is embraced but altered to suit the Federation's needs to ensure steady recruitment and absolute loyalty.

Cast

Production

Ed Neumeier, wrote the screenplay of the previous two Starship Troopers films, and makes his directorial debut with this film. Neumeier says that he sees the Troopers as each reflecting different wars, and where the first film is inspired by the Second World War movies, this film is more of a Vietnam War film. The story also deals with issues of religion and politics, and is about "how the state can use religion both badly, and for good."

Casper Van Dien returned for the third film and had been willing to return for the second film, but said Phil Tippett wanted to go a different direction.

Production started in May 2007, with principal photography commencing in South Africa.

Robert Skotak served as Visual Effects Supervisor, and Roger Nall was the Digital Effects Supervisor responsible for the CGI creature design and the marauder battle armor sequences. Nall lead a team of about 25 people. Their team worked on over 350 effects shots for the bugs, and the Marauder sequence required about 100 shots more. Other companies worked on sequences such as space ships, puppet work, wire removal and more, an estimated 150 additional effects shots.

Release

Home media
The film was released both Blu-ray and DVD on August 5, 2008. It is also part of Starship Troopers Trilogy DVD set, which contains the first three films in the series. Stephen Hogan's rendition of the theme song "A Good Day to Die" as Sky Marshall Omar Anoke is a bonus feature in the Blu-ray release. Film critic Joe Leydon wrote for Variety, "Omar Anoke, the heroic sky marshal in charge of battling the big bugs, is a charismatic celebrity and chart-topping singer whose onstage movements and militaristic song list suggest Adolf Hitler as an 'American Idol' contestant." Scott Lowe of IGN wrote, "the Sky Marshal's saber rattling pop single... calls to mind Lee Greenwood's 'I'm Proud to Be an American,'" despite also commenting it's "the most ridiculous and time wasting feature."

Home media sales totaled $4,989,719.

Reception

Critical response
Starship Troopers 3: Marauder received mixed reviews. On Rotten Tomatoes, the film has an approval rating of 50% based on 6 reviews, 3 positive and 3 negative.

Leydon of Variety said: "Die-hard fans of Starship Troopers, Paul Verhoeven's notorious 1997 cult-fave sci-fi spectacle, will be pleased to note that its second made-for-vid sequel gamely attempts to replicate the original pic's over-the-top style and self-satirical tone. Unlike 2004's negligible Starship Troopers 2: Hero of the Federation, a relatively straightforward actioner, the latest episode reprises Verhoeven's love-it-or-hate-it mix of gruesome mayhem, overstated melodrama, peek-a-boo nudity and tongue-in-cheek fascist aesthetics." 
Alex Dorn of UGO.com stated that "fans of the original movie should be pretty happy with this venture" but that those "expecting the whiz-bang big budget wonder of the original will be disappointed." He gave the film an overall rating of a B minus.
Scott Weinberg of FEARnet gave the film a positive review, stating that the film is "probably a rental more so than a must-own, but certainly worth a look if you dug the first film".
Ain't It Cool News gave the film a mixed review, saying the effects were a step down from the work of Phil Tippett in the second film, but welcomed the return to the satirical tone of the first film. The reviewer found the satire uneven, too specific at times, but also at other times unclear. He notes the problems and limitations of direct-to-video productions but concludes "if you can get past that and you enjoy this world then there is goofy fun to be had."

Lowe at IGN gave the film 3 out of 10 and although he was impressed by the production values, he was not impressed by the film: "The bottom line is that Starship Troopers 3 is a film that even Starship Troopers fans will have trouble enjoying. Even the return of Casper Van Dien and added studio interest and budget could not salvage this film from the perils of its own shortcomings." 
David Nusair of ReelFilm found it less effective than the second film and called it "a misfire of near epic proportions".

Accolades

In March 2009, Starship Troopers 3: Marauder was nominated for a 2009 Saturn Award in the Best DVD Release Category.

Sequels

It is followed by two computer-animated films, Starship Troopers: Invasion (2012) and Starship Troopers: Traitor of Mars (2017).

The German fan film Starship Troopers: Deadlock (2022) by Steffen Werner also "praises it to be a sequel to Starship Troopers 3", with connections to all three live-action and two animated movies. Hollywood Gold Awards commented that the "acting, the writing, and the overall directing of the film [...] end up fragmenting the action and cutting the flow of the film", while also describing it as "not any ordinary fan film", with "beautiful and realistic" costumes and props, and for "lovers of the genre [...] this work is a gem and will definitely be appreciated". Starship Troopers: Deadlock has received several awards.

See also
 List of films featuring powered exoskeletons

References

External links
 

2008 films
American satirical films
American science fiction war films
American space adventure films
Bold Films films
Direct-to-video sequel films
Religion in science fiction
Films about extraterrestrial life
Films scored by Klaus Badelt
Films set on fictional planets
Stage 6 Films films
Sony Pictures direct-to-video films
Starship Troopers films
2008 directorial debut films
2000s English-language films
2000s American films
Films about capital punishment